Ice Cream Man is a 1995 American direct-to-video black comedy horror film produced and directed by Norman Apstein and written by Sven Davison and David Dobkin. The film stars Clint Howard as the title character, Olivia Hussey, Jan-Michael Vincent, David Warner and David Naughton. The film's plot follows a deranged man (named "Gregory Tudor") who was recently released from a psychiatric institution and opens up an ice cream factory where he begins using human flesh in his recipes. The film has developed a cult following among viewers who see and enjoy it as an unintentional comedy for the film's campy production values. Joe Bob Briggs hosted the film on TNT when it was shown on MonsterVision. Howard himself made an appearance, discussing the film with Briggs. The film had an estimated $2 million budget and was released on DVD in 2004.

Plot
In a 1960s Californian suburb, young Gregory Tudor witnesses his local ice cream man, known as "The Ice Cream King", murdered in a drive-by shooting. In the present, Gregory has taken over the "King's" business, calling himself "The Ice Cream Prince", and using the man's truck and parlor. Unbeknownst to the public, Gregory uses the dilapidated parlor as a sort of laboratory, where he produces his concoctions, filled with insects and dismembered human pieces.

One night, Gregory kills a dog belonging to Nurse Wharton, his landlord and an orderly who treated him for his childhood trauma. The same night, Roger, a neighborhood boy, goes missing. Having witnessed Gregory's creepy personality, the other children suspect him of kidnapping Roger, but the police and Wharton do not. Three kids, Johnny, Heather, and Tuna, agree to search for Roger. Soon after, another boy known as Small Paul disappears.

Initially unable to prove that Gregory is dangerous, the kids have a difficult time getting the police to pursue their claims. Meanwhile, Gregory has recurring flashbacks to his abusive treatment at the Wishing Well Sanatorium. As the kids dig deeper, they discover that Gregory kidnapped Roger and Small Paul, and imprisons them in a cage at the parlor. However, Small Paul shows a macabre interest in the experiments, so Gregory takes him under his wing.

Two detectives investigate the Wishing Well, which is an unregulated free-for-all; the unstable patients roam freely and cause chaos, while the doctors and administrators are insane. Escaping, the police now believe the children, and prepare to search for Roger and Small Paul. Gregory kidnaps Tuna, and Heather enlists the help of Tuna's older brother Jacob to investigate, but Gregory kills Jacob and Jacob's girlfriend. Small Paul baits Gregory by holding a photo of the Ice Cream King over his face, and leads him into the main mixer, where Gregory is dismembered.

Roger and Tuna are reunited with their friends, who reveal that Small Paul has been sent to therapy. The final scene shows Small Paul alone in a darkened room, silently churning an ice cream bucket, his face twisted into an evil leer just like Gregory's.

Cast
Clint Howard as Gregory Tudor
Matthew McCurley as Young Gregory Tudor
Justin Isfeld as Johnny Spodak
Anndi McAfee as Heather Langley
JoJo Adams as Tuna Cassera
Mikey LeBeau as Small Paul
Zachary Benjamin as Roger Smith
Olivia Hussey as Nurse Wharton
David Naughton as Martin Cassera
Sandahl Bergman as Marion Cassera
Karl Makinen as Jacob Spodak
Steve Garvey as Mr. Spodak
Janet Wood as Mrs. Spodak
Andrea Evans as Wanda
Stephanie Champlin as Janet
Jan-Michael Vincent as Detective Gifford
Lee Majors II as Detective Maldwyn
Tom Reilly as Charley
Stephen Fiachi as Gus
David Warner as Reverend Langley
Jeanine Anderson as Mrs. Langley
Jessica Devlin as Mrs. Smith
Marla Frees as Gregory's Mother

Canceled sequel
On October 9, 2014, a Kickstarter campaign, backed by star Clint Howard, was started to fund a sequel (titled Ice Cream Man 2: Sundae Bloody Sundae) to coincide with the film's 20th anniversary. However, the campaign was closed on 30 October 2014 after only 70 backers and just over $4,000 was made. However, it is stated that the project has not been abandoned and stated that they are looking for a new crowdfunding structure and alternative financing for the film. There is no current news on the filming of the film.

References

External links
 
 
 
1995 films
1995 horror films
1990s slasher films
American serial killer films
American slasher films
American comedy horror films
Slasher comedy films
Films about cannibalism
Ice cream
1990s comedy horror films
Parodies of horror
1995 comedy films
1990s English-language films
1990s American films